Vespasian V. Pella (4/17 January 1897, in Bucharest – 24 August 1952, in New York City) was a Romanian legal expert.

Legal career and opinions
During the interwar period, he promoted the notion of 
international criminal proceedings against heads of state found guilty of crimes against humanity by the establishment of a special international tribunal for that purpose. In 1938 he served as President of the Committee on Legal Questions of the League of Nations.

He was elected a corresponding member of the Romanian Academy in 1943.

In 1944 he was appointed Romanian Ambassador to Switzerland, and in that capacity saved several Romanian Jews from deportation to Nazi occupied Poland.

In 1948, he took part in formulating the Convention on the Prevention and Punishment of the Crime of Genocide .

He kept advocating the idea of establishing an international criminal court and, in 1950, presented his proposals to that effect to the International Law Commission (UN document A/CN.4/39), which deliberated over the issue in its meetings of 5 to 6 July 1950.

Works

Books
 La criminalité collective des états et le droit pénal de l'avenir, Bucarest : Imprimerie de l'état, 1925
 "Vers l'unification du droit pénal par la création d'un Institut international auprès de la Société des Nations", (1928) 3 Études Crimin. 49-56
 La Guerre-Crime et les Criminels de Guerre, Paris, 1946
 The International Association of Penal Law and the Safeguarding of Peace, Paris, 1947

Articles
 "Towards an International Criminal Court" American Journal of International Law, Vol. 44, 1950, p. 37

References

External links
 Article mentioning Pella
 Benjamin B. Ferencz, The Draft Code of Offences Against the Peace and Security of Mankind

1897 births
1960 deaths
Lawyers from Bucharest
Ambassadors of Romania to Switzerland
Corresponding members of the Romanian Academy
Romanian expatriates in the United States
Diplomats from Bucharest